The American Society of International Law (ASIL), founded in 1906, was chartered by the United States Congress in 1950 to foster the study of international law, and to promote the establishment and maintenance of international relations on the basis of law and justice. ASIL holds Category II Consultative Status to the United Nations Economic and Social Council, and is a constituent society of the American Council of Learned Societies. ASIL is headquartered in Washington, D.C.

Among the Society's publications are The American Journal of International Law (published four times a year), International Legal Materials (published every other month since 1962), Benchbook on International Law, and Proceedings of the ASIL Annual Meeting.

See also

American Society of Comparative Law
Grotius Lectures (annual lecture series sponsored by the American Society of International Law)

References

External links
 

Academic organizations based in the United States
International law organizations
Member organizations of the American Council of Learned Societies
Patriotic and national organizations chartered by the United States Congress
1906 establishments in the United States
Organizations established in 1906
Embassy Row

Non-profit organizations based in Washington, D.C.
501(c)(3) organizations